Dawlish is a former government town whose site is located in the locality of Erskine north of Peterborough, South Australia.<ref>{{cite web|title=Search results for "Dawlish, Gtwn" using datasets selected for 'Suburbs and Localities', Government Towns' and 'Gazetter'|url=http://location.sa.gov.au/viewer/|website=Location SA Map Viewer|publisher=Government of South Australia|accessdate=25 December 2017}}</ref>

The area is arid and although a town was laid out, on 8 June 1882 but it never developed.  "In 1964, as there was no demand for allotments, the few that had been sold were acquired compulsorily by the Crown and reverted back to broad acres."''

The name comes from Devon, England, where in the Domesday Book the Town of Dawlish was recorded as Doelis or ‘hallowed place’

References

Ghost towns in South Australia